Caithness Rugby Football Club is a rugby union club from Thurso that compete in the  league.

History

The club was founded in 1962. It opened to over 400 fans to play an Edinburgh select side.

George Sutherland has been appointed Head Coach for the season 2019–20.

Teams

Caithness currently run a Men's side; an Under 18 side; boys youth sides and girls youth sides.

The women's side is called the Caithness Krakens.

Caithness Sevens

The club run the Caithness Sevens tournament.

A women's sevens event was run for the first time in 2022, with the Caithness Krakens winning.

Honours

Men

Caithness Sevens
 Champions: 1985, 1987, 1991, 1993
Highland District League
Champions (1): 1972-73
North District League
Champions (1): 1991-92

Women

Caithness Sevens
 Champions: 2022

Notable players

Scotland 'A' internationals

  Tommy McGee

References

Scottish rugby union teams
Thurso
Rugby clubs established in 1962
Rugby union in Highland
1962 establishments in Scotland
Sport in Caithness